Vāne Parish was an administrative territorial entity of Tukums Municipality in the Courland region of Latvia. It was part of the former Kandava Municipality from 2009 until 2021.

History 
In the territory of today's Vāne Parish there were historically Aizupe Manor (Aizupe), Vāne Manor (Vane), Varieb Manor (Varieba).

In 1935 the area of Vāne Parish was 60.2 km². In 1945 the parish councils of Vāne and Sarcene were established, but in 1949 the parish was dissolved. In 1954 the villages of Sarcene and Varieb were added to the village of Vāne and in 1973 the village of Aizupe was also added. In 1990 the village was reorganized into a parish. In 2009, the parish was included as an administrative territory in Kandava Municipality.

Towns, villages and settlements of Vāne parish 
  – parish administrative center

See also 
Aizupe Manor

References 

Parishes of Latvia
Tukums Municipality
Courland